Prądy  (German Brande) is a village in the administrative district of Gmina Dąbrowa, within Opole County, Opole Voivodeship, in south-western Poland.

The village has a population of 370.

External links 
 Jewish Community in Prądy on Virtual Shtetl

References

Villages in Opole County